Paul-Henri Cugnenc (1 June 1946 – 3 July 2007) was a French surgeon.

1946 births
2007 deaths
French surgeons
Rally for the Republic politicians
Union for a Popular Movement politicians
Deputies of the 12th National Assembly of the French Fifth Republic
Deputies of the 13th National Assembly of the French Fifth Republic
20th-century surgeons